Tirathaba haematella is a species of moth of the family Pyralidae. It was described by George Hampson in 1901. It is found on the Aru Islands.

References 

Tirathabini
Moths described in 1901